Zhangshu, formerly Qingjiang County (Tsingkiang), is a county-level city under the administration of the prefecture-level city of Yichun, in the west-central part of Jiangxi Province. It is the first county of China Top 100 County in Jiangxi Province. The literal translation of the name is Camphor laurel, because traditionally, the city was a major commercial hub for camphor laurel oil. Zhangshu is  famous for Chinese medicinal herbs. The China top 10 medicine producer Renhe Group is located there. Officially, it is the Medicine Capital of China, and there are thousands of pharmaceutical companies. Hundreds of thousands of kinds of Chinese herbal medicines are sold by bulk or by retail.

Administration 

Zhangshu City currently has five sub-districts, 10 towns and 4 townships.

5 Sub-districts:

10 Towns:

4 Townships:

Education 
Higher Education:

Jiangxi Agricultural Engineering College

High School:

Zhangshu City High School

Complete School:

Zhangshu City 2nd Complete School, Zhangshu City 3rd Complete School, Qingjiang Complete School.

Junior High School:

Changfu Junior High School, Zhangjiashan High School, Huangtugang High School.

Primary School:

Zhangshu City 1st Primary School, Zhangshu City 8th Primary School, Zhangshu City 4th Primary School, Anyang Primary School, Changfu Town Central Primary.

Tourism
Wucheng Site

Zhuweicheng Site

Fanchengdui (archaeological site)

Mingshui Bridge

Linjiang Grand View Pavilion

Linjiang Bell Tower

Sanhuang Palace

Mao Zedong's House

Zhangshu City Museum

Medicine Capital Park

Mountain Ge Resorts

Zhangshu Guhai Resorts

Zhangshu Waterfront Park

Zhangshu Fountain Square

Transportation 
Railway Station:

Zhangshu Railway Station

Zhangshu East Railway Station

Expressway:

Changzhang Expressway : Nanchang to Zhangshu

Ganyue Expressway : Jiangxi Province to Guangdong Province

Hurui Expressway : Shanghai Municipality to Ruili City Yunnan Province

Coach Station:

Zhangshu Coach Station

Jingjiu Coach Station

Wharf:

Zhangshu Gan River Wharf

Climate

External links
 https://web.archive.org/web/20150811203534/http://www.zhangshu.gov.cn/

References

 
County-level divisions of Jiangxi